Taita–Taveta County previously known as Taita Taveta District is a county of Kenya. The County headquarters are located in Mwatate sub-county, which is one of the six counties in the Jumuiya ya Kaunti za Pwani regional economic bloc. Major towns include Voi, Taveta, Mwatate and Wundanyi

The population of Taita-Taveta county was 340,671 persons according to the 2019 national census, with population densities ranging from 14 persons per km2 to more than 117 persons per km2. This is due to the varied rainfall and terrain with the lower zones receiving an average 440 mm of rain per annum and the highland areas receiving up to 1,900 mm of rain. The county ranges in altitude from 500 m above sea level to 2,300 m at Vuria peak, which is the county's highest point.

Land Use
Taita-Taveta  county covers an area of 17,083.9 km2, of which 62% or 11,100 km2 is within Tsavo East and Tsavo West National Parks. The remaining 5,876 km2 consists of small scale farms, ranches, sisal estates, water bodies (such as Lakes Chala and Jipe in Taveta and Mzima springs), and the hilltop forests.

The lowland areas of the county outside the national parks are farms, ranches, estates, and wildlife sanctuaries which receive an average of 440 mm of rain per annum whereas the highlands receive up to 1900 mm. Altitudes range from 500 meters above sea level to almost 2300 m at the highest point in the county of  Vuria Peak. The county has approximately 25 ranches in cattle grazing. The three operating sisal estates in the county are Teita Sisal Estate, Voi Sisal Estate and Taveta Sisal Estate. Many ranches have ventured into wildlife tourism and conservation. The Taita Hills and Saltlick Lodges sanctuary are among the well known tourism attractions in Taita Taveta.

There are 48 forests which have survived on hill tops in Taita Taveta county of which 28 are gazetted and are under government protection and management. They range in size from small 500 square metre patches with a few remnant trees to modestly vast 2 square kilometer indigenous and exotic forest mountains. These forests are part of the unique Eastern Arc range of forests found mostly in eastern Tanzania with the Taita Hills forming the only Kenyan portion of that forest type.

Taita Hills forest hold a unique biodiversity with 13 taxa of plants and 9 taxa of animals found only in the Taita Hills and nowhere else in the world. In addition, 22 plant species found in the Taita Hills forests are typical of the Eastern Arc forests. Within these beautiful indigenous forests, bubbles clean water flowing to the lowland areas catering for both human economic activities and wildlife.

Human – Wildlife Conflict 
At Tsavo National Park covers approximately two-thirds of the land area of Taita Taveta County, growth in human population causes conflict with wildlife.  

The national population census carried out in 1969 put the number of persons in Taita Taveta district at 110,742. The Kenya Population and Housing Census of August 2019 found that the number of people in Taita -Taveta county was 340,671 representing an increase of 207.6% in fifty years. The growth of the human population means that the land close to the park boundaries is converted from bush land into settlements. Consequently, people have been killed by wildlife, as others lose crops and livestock.

The national government has a mechanism for financially compensating families for wildlife-related deaths and destruction of property, but residents of Taita Taveta say the process of claiming compensation is too tedious. A television news report broadcast in September 2018 revealed that only ten out of more than 1,500 claims for compensation in the county had been paid out in the previous five years.

Tourist Attractions 
Lake Jipe , Lake Chala, Kisigau Montain ,Taita hills, Shomoto Hill, Aruba Dam, Mudanda Rock, Yatta Plateau, Lugard Falls, Tsavo National Reserve, Shetani Lava Flow, Mzima Springs

Population

Religion

Sub-Counties
The seat of the county government of Taita Taveta is at the small town of Wundanyi, and the largest town being Voi.

Constituencies 
The county has four constituencies: 
Taveta Constituency
Wundanyi Constituency
Mwatate Constituency
Voi Constituency

Wards 
The county has the following wards :

 Bomeni Ward
 Werugha Ward
 Rong’e Ward
 Mahoo Ward
 Kasighau Ward
 Sagala Ward
 Marungu Ward
 Kaloleni Ward
 Ngolia Ward
 Wusi/Kishamba Ward
 Mbololo Ward
 Chawia Ward
 Bura Ward
 Mwanda/Mghange Ward
 Mata Ward
 Wundanyi/Mbale Ward
 Wumingu/Kishushe Ward
 Mboghoni Ward
 Chala Ward
 Mwatate Ward

See also
List of ranches, estates and sanctuaries in Taita–Taveta County
Bungule
Dembwa
Lushangonyi
Miasenyi
Ngolia

References

External links 
 Taita Taveta County Government Official Site
 Taita Taveta County Government Official Facebook page
 Taita Taveta County Government Official Twitter Page
 Taita Taveta County Assembly Official Site

Counties of Kenya